Thomas Nicholson Gibbs  (March 11, 1821 – April 7, 1883) was a Canadian parliamentarian.

Born in Terrebonne, Lower Canada (now Quebec), the eldest son of Thomas Gibbs and Caroline Tate, his family moved to Oshawa, Upper Canada (now Ontario) in 1832. He became one of the most successful business men in Canada.

In 1867, he was elected to the House of Commons of Canada for the riding of Ontario South. A Liberal-Conservative, he was re-elected in 1872. He was defeated in 1874 but was re-elected in an 1876 by-election. However, he was defeated again in 1878. In 1873, he was the Secretary of State for the Provinces, Superintendent-General of Indian Affairs, and the Minister of Inland Revenue.

In 1880, he was appointed to the Senate representing the senatorial division of Newmarket, Ontario. He died in office in 1883.

External links
 
 

1821 births
1883 deaths
Conservative Party of Canada (1867–1942) MPs
Conservative Party of Canada (1867–1942) senators
Canadian senators from Ontario
Members of the House of Commons of Canada from Ontario
Members of the King's Privy Council for Canada
People from Terrebonne, Quebec
Members of the Legislative Assembly of the Province of Canada from Canada West